Chippewa Township is a civil township of Chippewa County in the U.S. state of Michigan. As of the 2010 census, the township population was 213.

Communities 

Geography
Chippewa Township is located in western Chippewa County.

Demographics
As of the census of 2000, there were 238 people, 92 households, and 65 families residing in the township.  The population density was 2.5 per square mile (1.0/km2).  There were 273 housing units at an average density of 2.9 per square mile (1.1/km2).  The racial makeup of the township was 89.08% White, 5.88% Native American, 1.68% Asian, and 3.36% from two or more races. Hispanic or Latino of any race were 0.84% of the population.

There were 92 households, out of which 33.7% had children under the age of 18 living with them, 59.8% were married couples living together, 7.6% had a female householder with no husband present, and 28.3% were non-families. 25.0% of all households were made up of individuals, and 10.9% had someone living alone who was 65 years of age or older.  The average household size was 2.59 and the average family size was 3.08.

In the township the population was spread out, with 26.9% under the age of 18, 7.1% from 18 to 24, 26.1% from 25 to 44, 24.4% from 45 to 64, and 15.5% who were 65 years of age or older.  The median age was 41 years. For every 100 females, there were 108.8 males.  For every 100 females age 18 and over, there were 114.8 males.

The median income for a household in the township was $32,500, and the median income for a family was $34,306. Males had a median income of $27,500 versus $18,750 for females. The per capita income for the township was $12,433.  About 9.1% of families and 13.2% of the population were below the poverty line, including 16.2% of those under the age of eighteen and 3.3% of those 65 or over.

References

Notes

Sources

Townships in Chippewa County, Michigan
Townships in Michigan